Eva Katherine Hamlin Miller (born 1911 in Brooklyn, New York - 1991) was an artist from Greensboro, North Carolina. She grew up in New York City and studied at the Pratt Institute in Brooklyn, New York; Columbia University, the Graduate School of Fine Art in Florence and the University of Ibadan in Nigeria before moving to North Carolina.

She became an art instructor at Bennett College in 1937, and went on to have a long career as an educator in many universities and colleges, as well as the Greensboro city schools.

Along with former student and Greensboro Congresswoman, Alma Adams, Miller helped cofound the African American Atelier in 1990. She served as its curator until her death in 1991.

Early life 
Miller was born in Brooklyn, New York and was raised in New York City. She was the daughter of Floyd and Katherine Hamlin. She attended the Pratt Institute and earned her B.F.A. degree in fine arts there, then moved on to earn her M.A. in degree in art education at Columbia University.

Professional Positions 
Hamlin served as associate professor of art at North Carolina A&T State University, in which she founded and owned the Z Gallery. In addition, Miller headed art departments at Bennett College, Tuskegee Institute, and Winston-Salem State University. She was a professor at North Carolina A&T State University. There she founded the HC Taylor Art Gallery. She served 8 years as the art supervisor for Greensboro public schools.

Personal life 
Miller married Dr. W. Lloyd T. Miller and had two sons, Floyd T. Miller and Tyrone Miller. Miller also had four grandchildren.

Works 
Miller has created many masterpieces. Her art work consists of stained glass art and her paintings of African themes and issues. Listed down below is a list of her artwork. It is sorted by year and alphabetically.

Complexities of the Madonna, 1964

Sound into Sight - A Rhapsody, 1964

Luba Mask, 1968

A time to leave, 1975

Song of Mozambique #2, 1975

Nefertiti, 1991

Skinny Dipping

...

She also designed the stained-glass windows at Bennett College, Saint James Presbyterian Church, Saint Matthews Methodist Church, and the Shiloh Baptist Church.

Miller had many artists look up to her. John Rogers, who was "a painter, graphic artist and designer" saw mentorship in her, which led him to collaborate with her numerous times. Rogers wasn't the only one who saw her as a mentor, many of her students said she inspired them to be better artists and people.

Death 
Miller died on December 26, 1991 in New York City. Her funeral was held at St. James Presbyterian Church and she was buried in Maplewood Cemetery.

Achievements 
Miller experienced many achievements throughout her lifetime. In the book Greensboro North Carolina, Otis Hairston writes, "one of the highlights of her career included an invitation by President and Mrs. Carter to the White House for her recognition as a major African-American artist." She was curator of the African American Atelier until she died.

References 

1911 births
1991 deaths
20th-century American women artists
People from Greensboro, North Carolina
Pratt Institute alumni
Teachers College, Columbia University alumni
University of Ibadan alumni
Bennett College faculty
Tuskegee University faculty
Winston-Salem State University faculty
American women academics